Jeremy Mill Bernard (born November 4, 1961) served as the White House social secretary. Bernard was appointed to the position by President Barack Obama on February 25, 2011.  He was the first male, as well as the first openly gay individual, to serve as the White House social secretary.

Early life
Bernard was born to Herschel and Loretta (Utterback) Bernard and raised in San Antonio, Texas, where he attended TMI — The Episcopal School of Texas.  His father was a fundraiser for Robert F. Kennedy and Ted Kennedy.  Bernard attended Hunter College in New York City, but did not graduate.

Career
Bernard is a prominent Democratic fundraiser and gay rights advocate who served for eight years on the Democratic National Committee.  He worked in the Obama administration in Washington as the White House liaison to the National Endowment for the Humanities and later, in Paris, as senior adviser and chief of staff to the United States ambassador to France.

Works

References 

Hunter College alumni
LGBT people from Texas
Gay politicians
Living people
Obama administration personnel
Politicians from San Antonio
1961 births
TMI Episcopal alumni